Kolpaçino: Bomba is a 2011 Turkish comedy film, starring, co-written and directed by Şafak Sezer.

Release

See also
 Turkish films of 2011
 2011 in film

References

External links
  for the film (Turkish)
 

2011 comedy films
2011 films
Turkish comedy films
Warner Bros. films
Films set in Istanbul
Turkish sequel films